The 1886–87 season was the 14th Scottish football season in which Dumbarton competed at a national level.

Scottish Cup

Dumbarton reached their fourth Scottish Cup final full of confidence, especially having defeated Queen's Park in the semi final, but it wasn't to be and Dumbarton lost out to the East of Scotland Shield holders Hibernian by the odd goal in three.

Dumbartonshire Cup

Dumbarton met their old rivals Renton in the third round and found them to be too good on the day.

Glasgow Charity Cup

It was much the same story in the Glasgow Charity Cup, where Dumbarton fell at the first hurdle to Queen's Park.

Friendlies

During the season, 28 'friendly' matches were played, including home and away ties against Rangers and 3rd LRV, matches against Lanarkshire Cup holders, Airdrie and Renfrewshire Cup holders, Abercorn and a two match north of Scotland tour in the New Year Holidays.  In addition, four matches were played against English opposition, including a north of England tour during Easter.  In all, 9 were won, 7 drawn and 12 lost, scoring 61 goals and conceding 62.

Player statistics
Of note amongst those donning the club's colours for the first time were John Madden and William Robertson.
At the same time 5-time internationalist Michael Paton was lost from the club's squad.

Only includes appearances and goals in competitive Scottish Cup matches.

Source:

International caps

An international trial match was played on 5 March 1887 to consider selection of teams to represent Scotland in the upcoming games in the 1887 British Home Championship. Leitch Keir, James McAulay and Willie Robertson all took part.

Subsequently, four Dumbarton players were selected to play for Scotland, as follows:

- Leitch Keir earned his third and fourth caps against England and Wales respectively.  Keir scored in the 3-2 win over England.

- James McAulay earned his eighth and ninth caps against England and Wales respectively.

- Tom McMillan earned his first cap against Ireland.

- Willie Robertson earned his first and second caps against England and Wales respectively.  Robertson scored in the 2-0 win over Wales.

Representative Matches
Dumbarton players were selected to play for the Dumbartonshire county team as follows:

In addition Leitch Keir was selected to play in the West of Scotland side which played an East of Scotland XI on 24 May 1887.  The 'West' won 3-1.

Reserve team
Dumbarton rejoined the Second Eleven Association and duly reached their third final in the Scottish Second XI Cup in four attempts before losing out to the holders, Abercorn, after a drawn match.

In addition, Dumbarton entered the Dumbartonshire Second XI Cup competition, and reached the semi final before losing to eventual winners, Renton.

References

Dumbarton F.C. seasons
Scottish football clubs 1886–87 season